Aurora Steam Grist Mill was a historic grist mill located in Aurora, Cayuga County, New York.  It was a monolithic, -story rectangular stone structure built on the shore of Lake Cayuga. It was one of the first mills built west of the Hudson River to be powered by steam. In 1974, the building's roof collapsed due to neglect and plans were to restore it for use as a community center.  It was largely intact until 1992, when Wells College began to demolish it in order to build a dock behind the Aurora Inn.

It was listed on the National Register of Historic Places in 1976.

References

Industrial buildings completed in 1817
Buildings and structures in Cayuga County, New York
Grinding mills in New York (state)
National Register of Historic Places in Cayuga County, New York
Grinding mills on the National Register of Historic Places in New York (state)